Malassezia folliculitis or Pityrosporum folliculitis,  is a skin condition caused by infection by Malassezia (formerly Pityrosporum) yeast.

The skin of the upper trunk area including the back, chest, arms and sometimes the neck is often affected and this condition is often seen in young to middle aged adults, although it has been known to occur in adults well into their sixties, and can also be found on the lower extremities as well. Its diagnosis is based on the pruritic (itchy) papulopustules found in a follicular pattern in these regions.

Pustules are caused by an overgrowth of the yeast (a type of fungus) Malassezia furfur (Pityrosporum ovale), which plugs the follicles. M. furfur is lipophilic, requiring fatty acids like what is present in oily skin to proliferate. It has been shown that Malassezia yeast grows by consuming fatty acids with carbon chain lengths C11 to C24.
Pityrosporum is part of the normal skin flora, but overgrows in certain conditions. Overgrowth is associated with oily skin, humidity or other pre-existing dermatologic conditions such as seborrheic dermatitis and severe dandruff.

See also 
 Skin lesion
 List of cutaneous conditions

References 

Mycosis-related cutaneous conditions